The 1965 All-Ireland Senior Club Camogie Championship for the leading clubs in the women's team field sport of camogie was won by St Patrick’s Glengoole (Tipperary), who defeated Deirdre (Antrim) in the final, played at Casement Park.

Arrangements
The championship was organised on the traditional provincial system used in Gaelic Games since the 1880s, with St Rita’s and St Ibar’s winning the championships of the other two provinces.

The Final
Scores were level at half time in the final, 1-3 to 2-0. Agnes Hourigan wrote in the Irish Press: The winners deserved the honours because they were always that shade faster to the ball, bur Deirdre, now runners-up in an All Ireland final for the second successive year, went down fighting magnificently. St Patrick’s had the star of the game in their captain, Anne Carroll, a wizard at midfield.

Provincial stages

Final stages

References

External links
 Camogie Association

1965 in camogie
1965
Cam